Dualchi is a comune (municipality) in the Province of Nuoro in the Italian region Sardinia, located about  north of Cagliari and about  west of Nuoro.

Dualchi borders the following municipalities: Aidomaggiore, Birori, Borore, Bortigali, Noragugume, Sedilo, Silanus.

History
Already inhabited area during the Nuragic period, as suggested by the presence in the territory of some Nuraghes, Dualchi belonged to the Judicate of Torress in the Middle Ages  and was part of the curatoria of Marghine. The village came under the influence of the Arborean Judges, when such curatoria became absorbed into the Arborean curatoria of Parte Barigadu. Upon the fall of the Arborean Judicate (1429), Dualchi became part of the Aragonese marquisate of Oristano. During the war, fought in 1478, between the Marquis of Oristano Leonardo Alagon and the viceroy of Aragon, the inhabitants of Dualchi swore allegiance to the Marquis and thereupon fought against the Aragonese, but they were defeated. The town then passed under Aragonese rule and became a fief thereof. In the 18th century it was incorporated into the marquisate of Marghine, the owners of which were the Pimentel. From the Pimentel it passed to the Tellez-Giron, to which it was ransomed in 1839 with the abolition of the feudal system.

References

External links

 Official website

Cities and towns in Sardinia